The discography of the American rock band Live consists of nine studio albums (including The Death of a Dictionary, recorded when the band was known as Public Affection), one live album, two compilation albums, three extended plays, twenty-eight singles and twenty-six music videos. After initially self-releasing a full-length album and an EP under the name Public Affection, their first studio album as Live, 1991's Mental Jewelry, peaked at number 73 on the Billboard 200. The single "Operation Spirit (The Tyranny of Tradition)" peaked at number nine on the Alternative Songs chart.

Live achieved commercial success with their next album, 1994's Throwing Copper. Helped by the singles "Selling the Drama", "I Alone", "Lightning Crashes", and "All Over You", the album reached number one on the music charts in the United States, Australia, New Zealand, and Canada. It went platinum eight times in the US and seven times in Canada. Throwing Copper is Live's best-selling album. "Selling the Drama" and "Lightning Crashes" both reached number one on the Alternative Songs chart.

The band's third album, Secret Samadhi, was released in 1997. It peaked at number one in the US, New Zealand, and Canada, and it went platinum twice in both the US and Canada. One single from the album, "Lakini's Juice", peaked at number one on the Alternative Songs chart.

In 1999, Live's fourth album, The Distance to Here, was released. It went to number one on the Australia and Canada charts and was certified platinum in the US and Canada. The band then released the studio albums V and Birds of Pray in 2001 and 2003, respectively, before releasing their first compilation album, Awake: The Best of Live, in 2004. Songs from Black Mountain, their seventh studio album, was released in 2006. The band has sold over 20 million albums worldwide.

Albums

Studio albums

Compilation albums

In addition, live acoustic versions of "Lightning Crashes" and "Run to the Water" were included on the compilation album Cold Live at the Chapel (later known as Cold Live at the Chapel Volume 1). These were recordings from the Australian television music show Live at the Chapel in 2000.

Live albums

EPs
 Divided Mind, Divided Planet (1990)
 Four Songs (1991)
 Local 717 (2018)

Singles

Music videos

Live songs in film
"The Dam at Otter Creek" – In the Army Now (1994)
"White, Discussion (Sever & Reynolds Remix)" – Virtuosity (1995)
"The Dolphin's Cry" – Urban Legends: Final Cut (2000)*
"Forever May Not Be Long Enough" – The Mummy Returns (2001)
"Deep Enough" (Remix) – The Fast and the Furious (2001)*
"Hold Me Up" – Zack and Miri Make a Porno (2008)*
"Lightning Crashes" – Kodachrome (2017)

* indicates that the track does not appear on the film's soundtrack album.

References

Discography
Discographies of American artists
Rock music group discographies
Alternative rock discographies